Gav Daneh Zar (also Romanized as Gāv Dāneh Zār; also known as Kān-e Zar, Kānī Zar, and Kan Zar) is a village in Khosrowabad Rural District, Chang Almas District, Bijar County, Kurdistan Province, Iran. At the 2006 census, its population was 73, in 14 families. The village is populated by Kurds.

References 

Towns and villages in Bijar County
Kurdish settlements in Kurdistan Province